Robert Berman was the co-founder in 1939, along with Roy Neuberger, of the eponymous Neuberger Berman investment and financial services company.

In 1950, their firm started one of the first no-load mutual funds in the United States, the Guardian Fund, which still operates today .

References

American money managers
American Jews
American company founders